Mark Petrovich Midler (24 September 1931 – 31 May 2012) was a Soviet Russian foil fencer. He competed at four Olympic Games, and won two gold medals.

Early and personal life
Midler was born in Moscow, Soviet Union, and was Jewish.

Fencing career
Midler was a member of the USSR National Fencing Team between 1951 and 1967. He trained at Burevestnik in Moscow.

Midler won the Soviet individual foil title six times (1954–57, 1963 and 1965) and Soviet Cup in 1961.

World Championships
Midler won four consecutive World Championships in Foil, in 1959 to 1962. He also won a silver medal in 1957 and bronze medals in 1959 and 1961. Along with his Soviet teammates, he won the World Team Championships in Foil five times:  in 1959, 1962, 1963, 1965, and 1966. They also won a silver medal in 1967.

Olympics
Midler was captain of the Foil team for the 1960 Olympic Games and the 1964 Olympic Games. They won the gold medal in Team Foil at both Olympics.

Coaching career
Midler coached fencing for the Olympic teams of the Soviet Union and Russia. From 1971 until 2000, Midler was the coach of the Soviet and later Russian national foil team. He was also the head coach of the Soviet 1980 Olympic foil team, Unified Team 1992 Olympic foil team, and Russian 1996 and 2000 Olympic foil teams.

Awards
Midler was inducted into the International Jewish Sports Hall of Fame in 1983. In 1960 he was awarded the Order of the Badge of Honor.

See also
List of select Jewish fencers

References

External links
Jewish Sports Legends bio
Jewish Sports bio

1931 births
2012 deaths
Soviet male foil fencers
Russian male foil fencers
Jewish male foil fencers
Jewish Russian sportspeople
Olympic fencers of the Soviet Union
Olympic gold medalists for the Soviet Union
Fencers at the 1952 Summer Olympics
Fencers at the 1956 Summer Olympics
Fencers at the 1960 Summer Olympics
Fencers at the 1964 Summer Olympics
Olympic medalists in fencing
Burevestnik (sports society) athletes
International Jewish Sports Hall of Fame inductees
Medalists at the 1960 Summer Olympics
Medalists at the 1964 Summer Olympics
Russian fencing coaches